The 1969 Temple Owls football team was an American football team that represented Temple University as a member of the Middle Atlantic Conference (MAC) during the 1969 NCAA College Division football season. In its tenth and final season under head coach George Makris, the team compiled a 4–5–1 record (1–2–1 against MAC opponents). The team played its home games at Temple Stadium in Philadelphia.

Makris resigned at the end of the 1969 season. He compiled a 45–44–4 record in 10 years as Temple's head football coach.

Schedule

References

Temple
Temple Owls football seasons
Temple Owls football